Caraula is a commune in Dolj County, Oltenia, Romania with a population of 2,560 people. It is composed of a single village, Caraula.

References

Communes in Dolj County
Localities in Oltenia